The knockout phase of UEFA Women's Euro 2022 began on 20 July 2022 and ended on 31 July 2022 with the final.

All times local (UTC+1).

Format
In the knockout stage, extra time and a penalty shoot-out were used to decide the winner if necessary.

Qualified teams
The top two placed teams from each of the four groups qualified for the knockout stage.

Bracket

Quarter-finals

England vs Spain

Germany vs Austria

Sweden vs Belgium

France vs Netherlands

Semi-finals

England vs Sweden

Germany vs France

Final

Notes

References

External links
Official website

Knockout stage